The 2019 Copa Venezuela was the 50th edition of the competition. It began on 27 July 2019 with the first stage and concluded on 27 November 2019 with the second leg of the finals. The champions will qualify for the 2020 Copa Sudamericana. Primera División side Zulia were the defending champions, but they were eliminated by Academia Puerto Cabello in the quarter-finals.

Zamora won their first title in the competition after defeating Monagas on away goals in the final, and qualified for the 2020 Copa Sudamericana.

First stage
Teams entering the competition at this round: 16 teams from the Segunda División.
The first legs were played on 27 and 28 July and the second legs were played on 3 August 2019.

|}

First leg

Second leg

Second stage

 Teams entering the competition at this round: 19 teams from the Primera División, 4 teams from the Segunda División.
 The draw for the second stage and subsequent stages was held on 13 August 2019 at the FVF headquarters in Caracas.
 The first legs were played on 3–4 and 12 September and the second legs were played on 17 and 18 September 2019.

|-
!colspan=5|Centro-Occidental Group

!colspan=5|Centro-Oriental Group

|}

First leg

Second leg

Final stages

Round of 16
 The first legs were played on 9 October and the second legs were played on 16 and 17 October 2019.

|-
!colspan=5|Centro-Occidental Group

!colspan=5|Centro-Oriental Group

|}

First leg

Second leg

Quarter-finals
 The first legs were played on 23 October and the second legs were played on 30 October 2019.

|-
!colspan=5|Centro-Occidental Group

!colspan=5|Centro-Oriental Group

|}

First leg

Second leg

Semi-finals
 The first legs were played on 6 November and the second legs were played on 13 November 2019.

|}

First leg

Second leg

Finals
The finals were played on 20 and 27 November 2019.

Tied 3–3 on aggregate, Zamora won on away goals.

References

External links
Official website of the Venezuelan Football Federation 
Copa Venezuela 2019, Soccerway.com

Copa Venezuela
Venezuela
2019 in Venezuelan football